Urak (Uraq) is a rural locality (a village) in Nizhnekiginsky Selsoviet, Kiginsky District, Bashkortostan, Russia. The population was 37 as of 2010. There is 1 street.

Geography 
Urak is located 23 km north of Verkhniye Kigi (the district's administrative centre) by road. Nizhniye Kigi is the nearest rural locality.

References 

Rural localities in Kiginsky District